George Lance Calkin (22 June 1859 – 10 October 1936) was a British painter.

Calkin was the second child in a family of seven siblings. He was born in London, to Emily and George Calkin, a musician and composer. He was educated in a private school and then attended the Slade School of Fine Art and the Royal Academy Schools. His principal works were portraits of King Edward VII, King George V, Marquis of Camden and Joseph Chamberlain. Many of his works were reproduced in the weekly illustrated newspaper The Graphic.

Calkin married Alice Annie O’Brien (1870–1957) in Camberwell in 1891; they had three daughters, Joan Margaret (b. 1892), Phyllis Eileen (b. 1894) and Enid (b. 1903). In 1895 he became a member of the Royal Institute of Oil Painters.

Calkin died in 1936 at Cresilton Road, Fulham, London.

References

External links

1859 births
1936 deaths
British portrait painters
19th-century British painters
British male painters
20th-century British painters
19th-century British male artists
20th-century British male artists